Pukara (Aymara for fortress, also spelled Pucara) is a mountain in the Andes of Bolivia which reaches a height of approximately . It is located in the La Paz Department, Murillo Province, La Paz Municipality. Pukara lies north of Ch'uñawi.

References 

Mountains of La Paz Department (Bolivia)